Himani Bhatt Shivpuri is an Indian actress known for her character roles in Bollywood films and Hindi soap operas. Her films include Hum Aapke Hain Koun..! (1994), Raja (1995), Dilwale Dulhania Le Jayenge (1995), Khamoshi (1996), Hero No. 1 (1997), Deewana Mastana (1997), Bandhan (1998), Kuch Kuch Hota Hai (1998), Biwi No.1 (1999), Hum Saath-Saath Hain (1999), Kabhi Khushi Kabhie Gham... (2001) and Main Prem Ki Diwani Hoon (2003).

She is currently working as Katori "Katto" Amma in &Tv's show Happu Ki Ultan Paltan.

Personal life 
Shivpuri was born in Dehradun, Uttarakhand, and educated at the all-boys boarding school, The Doon School, where her father, the poet Dr. Haridutt Bhatt "Shailesh", taught Hindi. At Doon, she was actively involved in dramatics. She began a parallel career in theatre while studying for a postgraduate degree in Organic Chemistry. She worked in Phir Wahi Talash as a supporting actress.

She married the Kashmiri Pandit actor Gyan Shivpuri, who died in 1995. She has a son, Katyayan.

Career 
After graduating from the National School of Drama in 1982, Shivpuri worked briefly with the NSD Repertory Company and then moved to Mumbai.

Shivpuri made her film debut in 1984 with Ab Ayega Mazaa, followed by In Which Annie Gives It Those Ones a TV film, in (1989), also starring Shahrukh Khan. She acted in many art films thereafter like Shyam Benegal's Suraj Ka Satvan Ghoda (1993) and Mammo (1994), though her big commercial break came with Sooraj R. Barjatya's Hum Aapke Hain Koun..! (1994).

She made her television debut with the serial Humrahi (DD National), directed by Kunwar Sinha, which gave her considerable popularity as her role of Devki Bhojai was widely appreciated. Earlier, she had made brief appearances in Lekh Tandon's TV show Phir Wahi Talash and Shyam Benegal's Yatra. After Humrahi, she became a regular feature on Indian television, starring in serials like Hasratein on Zee TV in 1995 as an unsatisfied wife forced to marry a man double her age and looking out for extramarital affairs to satiate her needs, Kasautii Zindagi Kay, Kyunki Saas Bhi Kabhi Bahu Thi as Raksha, Chandni, Dollar Bahu (Zee TV), Josh (Star Plus), Ek Ladki Anjaani Si and most recently in Ghar Ek Sapna (Sahara One) and India Calling (Star One). She has starred Baat Hamari Pakki Hai on Sony Entertainment Television Asia.

Though she works mainly in character actor, she has done some memorable roles in films like Koyla (1997), Pardes (1997), Dilwale Dulhania Le Jayenge (1995), Anjaam (1994), Kuch Kuch Hota Hai (1998) and Kabhi Khushi Kabhie Gham... (2001).

Over the years she has worked for many film production houses including Yash Raj Films (owned by director Yash Chopra), Rajshri Productions and Dharma Productions (owned by Yash Johar).

She was seen in J. P. Dutta's film Umrao Jaan.

Himani Shivpuri played Kul in Zee's Hamari Betiyoon Ka Vivaah until 2009.

She briefly appeared in a short documentary film The Facebook Generation. produced by Blue Strike Productions and Dev Samaj Modern School and Directed by Sahil Bhardwaj. The film competed in the Reel to Real film making competition at Harmony 2012 organised by The Global Education and Leadership Foundation and was among the top 10 finalists.

Filmography

Films
 Ab Ayega Mazaa (1984) as Sidey's sister
 In Which Annie Gives It Those Ones (1989) (TV)
 Suraj Ka Satvan Ghoda (1992)
 Dilwale (1994) as Sapna's aunt
 Dhanwaan (1993) as Hamidbhai's daughter-in-law
 Mammo (1994) as Anwari
 Hum Aapke Hain Koun..! (1994) as Razia
 Andaz (1994) (uncredited) as Mrs. Panipuri Sharma
 Anjaam (1994) as Nisha
 Yaar Gaddar (1994) as Police Inspector
 Aao Pyaar Karen (1994) as Shankar's wife
 Teesra Kaun? (1994) as Shanti Verma
 Trimurti (1995) as Janki Singh
 Raja (1995) as Kaki
 God and Gun (1995)
 Veergati (1995) as Sulokh's mom
 Dilwale Dulhania Le Jayenge (1995) as Kammo
 Yaraana (1995) as Beggar/Champa
 Haqeeqat (1995) as Kamini
 Bandish (1996)
 Prem Granth (1996) as Nathu
 Khamoshi: The Musical (1996) as Raj's mother
 Bal Bramhachari (1996) as Shanti
 Beqabu (1996) as Aarti Kapoor
 Diljale (1996)
 Pardes (1997) as Kulwanti
 Hero No. 1 (1997) as Shannu
 Koyla (1997) 
 Mere Sapno Ki Rani (1997) as Subhash's wife
 Betaabi (1997) as Radha, professor
 Deewana Mastana (1997) as Raja's mom
 Mr. and Mrs. Khiladi (1997) as Raja's mother
 Tirchhi Topiwale (1998)
 Jab Pyaar Kisise Hota Hai (1998) as Ragini Sinha
 Bandhan (1998) as Ramlal's wife
 Kuch Kuch Hota Hai (1998) as Rifat Bi
 Mehndi (film) (1998)
 Dahek: A Burning Passion (1999) as Mrs. Javed Bahkshi
 Nyaydaata (1999)
 Hum Saath-Saath Hain: We Stand United (1999) as Vakil's wife
 Aa Ab Laut Chalen (1999) as Mrs. Chaurasia
 Daag: The Fire (1999) as Kajri's mother
 Anari No. 1 (1999) as Rahul's Aunt
 Biwi No.1 (1999) as Susheela Devi Mehra
 Trishakti (1999) as Mrs. Laxmiprasad
 Hum Tum Pe Marte Hain (1999) as Umadevi
 Vaastav: The Reality (1999) as Laxmi Akka
 Khoobsurat (1999) as Savita
 Krodh (2000) as Sita
 Dulhan Hum Le Jayenge (2000) as Mary
 Baaghi (2000)
 Hadh Kar Di Aapne (2000) as Mrs. Bakhiyani
 Chal Mere Bhai (2000) as Sapna's aunt
 Tera Jadoo Chal Gayaa (2000) as Shyama Aapa
 Hamara Dil Aapke Paas Hai (2000) as Sita Pillai
 Karobaar: The Business of Love (2000) as Mrs. Saxena
 Dhaai Akshar Prem Ke (2000) as Sweety
 Jis Desh Mein Ganga Rehta Hain (2000) as Radha Ganga's biological mom
 Afsana Dilwalon Ka (2001) as Titlibai
 Jodi No.1 (2001) as wife of Kamal
 Mujhe Kucch Kehna Hai (2001) as Sushma
 Bas Itna Sa Khwaab Hai (2001)
 Kabhi Khushi Kabhie Gham (2001) as Haldiram's Wife
 Haan Maine Bhi Pyaar Kiya (2002) as Maria
 Hum Kisise Kum Nahin (2002) as Patient Ramgopal's wife
 Mujhse Dosti Karoge! (2002) as Mrs. Sahani
 Jeena Sirf Merre Liye (2002) as Mrs. Malhotra
 Karz: The Burden of Truth (2002)
 Ek Hindustani (2003)
 Ek Aur Ek Gyarah (2003) as Tara & Sitara's mom
 Main Prem Ki Diwani Hoon (2003) as Susheela
 Kuch Naa Kaho (2003) as Minty Ahluwalia
 Shart: The Challenge (2004)
 Ishq Hai Tumse (2004) as Kamla
 Time Pass (2005) as Kanchan Sharma
 Mumbai Godfather (2005)
 Chand Sa Roshan Chehra (2005)
 Meri Aashiqui (2005)
 Classic Dance of Love (2005)
 Insan (2005) as Indu's mom
 Khullam Khulla Pyaar Karen (2005) as Goverdhan's wife
 Koi Mere Dil Mein Hai (2005) as Mrs. I. M. Gore
 Maayavi (2005) (Tamil film) as Jyothika's mother
 Umrao Jaan (2006)
 Kismat Konnection (2008) as Mrs. Manpreet Gill
 Haal-e-Dil (2008) as Stella
 Karzzzz (2008) as J. J. Oberoi's Wife
 Do Knot Disturb (2009) as Goverdhan's mother
 Radio (2009) film (2009) as Shanya's Boss at Food Court
 Milenge Milenge (2010) as Mrs. Gandhi
 Sasural Simar Ka (2011) as Rajjo Dwivedi (Buaji)
 Ammaa ki boli (2012) as Kalavati
 The Facebook Generation (2012) as Herself (cameo)
 Rabba Main Kya Karoon (2012)
 Besharam (2013) as Tara's Mother
 Club 60 (2013) as Nalini Doctor
 Mr Joe B. Carvalho (2014)
 Meena (2014) as Ainul Bibi
 Wedding Pullav (2015) as Gulabo
 Nanu Ki Jaanu(2018) as Nanu's Mother
 When Obama Loved Osama (2018)
 Make In India (2019) as Palak Mother
 Teesra Kaun Returns (2020)  Shanti Aunty is Manjulah  Alia Bhatt Priyanka
 Kartoot (2022) as Khala

Serials
 Hum Aapke Hain Woh (1996-1997)
 Khatta Meetha (2000)
 Yatra
 Phir Wahi Talash
 Humrahi
 Hamari Betiyoon Ka Vivaah as Kulraj Kohli
 Hasratein as Sulakshana
 Gudgudee (1998-1999) as Durga Devi
 Sanjog Se Bani Sangini as Shanno
 I Luv My India
 Baat Hamari Pakki Hai as Nani
 Sasural Simar Ka as Rajjo Dwivedi
 Mrs. Kaushik Ki Paanch Bahuein as Mrs. Lajwanti)
 Ghar Ek Sapna
 Ajab Gajab Ghar Jamai as Nani-Saas
 Doli Armaano Ki as Sushma Tiwari (Sushmaji)
 Sumit Sambhal Lega as Rita
 Vishkanya...Ek Anokhi Prem Kahani as Renu
 Ek Vivah Aisa Bhi as Kalavati Parmar
 Home as Nirmala Manchanda
 Happu Ki Ultan Pultan as Katori "Amma" Singh
 Astitva...Ek Prem Kahani as Radha Ji

References

External links 
 
 
 

Indian film actresses
Indian stage actresses
Living people
National School of Drama alumni
Actresses in Hindi cinema
Hindi theatre
Indian television actresses
20th-century Indian actresses
21st-century Indian actresses
The Doon School alumni
Year of birth missing (living people)
People from Rudraprayag district
Actresses from Dehradun
Actresses in Hindi television